These are the Official Charts Company UK Official Indie Chart number one hits of 2000.

See also
2000 in music

References

United Kingdom Indie Singles
Indie 2000
UK Indie Chart number-one singles